Tokanui is a community in the eastern portion of Southland District Council, located on the Southern Scenic Route about 55 km east of Invercargill and 109 km southwest of Balclutha, New Zealand.

The town is a part of Statistics New Zealand's Toetoes area. In 2001 the area had 1,659 people living it. Tokanui was also the eastern terminus of the Tokanui Branch railway line operating from Invercargill.

External links 
Statistics New Zealand profile for Toetoes
 Waikawa Museum
 Tokanui School
 1911 railway timetable
 1956 aerial views of Tokanui and railway station

The Catlins
Populated places in Southland, New Zealand
Southland District